Marco Cecchinato and Matteo Donati were the defending champions but chose not to defend their title.

Kevin Krawietz and Andreas Mies won the title after defeating Tomasz Bednarek and David Pel 6–4, 6–2 in the final.

Seeds

Draw

References
 Main Draw
 Qualifying Draw

Sibiu Open - Doubles
2018 Doubles